Coleophora tamesis is a moth of the family Coleophoridae found in Asia and Europe.

Description
The wingspan is 11–14 mm. Adults are on wing from mid-June to August.

The larvae feed on the generative organs of jointed rush (Juncus articulatus) and saltmarsh rush (Juncus gerardii), forming a case made from silk and the remains of the seed capsule. It is 6–7 mm in length and the mouth angle is 15–20°. The case is similar to Coleophora taeniipennella which also uses the same host plants. The larvae overwinter with pupation taking place in May and June.

Distribution
It is found in most of Europe and is also known from the eastern part of the Palearctic realm and the Near East. It is also found in China.

References

External links
Swedish moths

tamesis
Moths of Asia
Moths of Europe
Moths described in 1929